Bufotenin (5-HO-DMT, bufotenine) is a tryptamine derivative, more specifically, a DMT analog, related to the neurotransmitter serotonin. It is an alkaloid found in some species of mushrooms, plants and toads, especially the skin.

The name bufotenin originates from the toad genus Bufo, which includes several species of psychoactive toads, most notably Incilius alvarius, that secrete bufotoxins from their parotoid glands. Bufotenin is similar in chemical structure to the psychedelics psilocin (4-HO-DMT), 5-MeO-DMT and DMT, chemicals which also occur in some of the same fungus, plant and animal species as bufotenin.

Nomenclature
Bufotenin (bufotenine) is also known by the chemical names 5-hydroxy-N,N-dimethyltryptamine (5-HO-DMT), N,N-dimethyl-5-hydroxytryptamine, dimethyl serotonin, and mappine.

History
Bufotenin was isolated from toad skin, and named by the Austrian chemist Handovsky at the University of Prague during World War I. The structure of bufotenine was confirmed in 1934 by Heinrich Wieland's laboratory in Munich, and the first reported synthesis of bufotenine was by Toshio Hoshino and Kenya Shimodaira in 1935.

Sources

Toads
Bufotenin is found in the poison and eggs of several species of toads belonging to the genus Bufo, but is most concentrated in the Colorado River toad (formerly Bufo alvarius, now Incilius alvarius), the only toad species with enough bufotenin for a psychoactive effect. Extracts of toad venom, containing bufotenin and other bioactive compounds, have been used in some traditional medicines such as ch'an su (probably derived from Bufo gargarizans), which has been used medicinally for centuries in China.

The toad was "recurrently depicted in Mesoamerican art", which some authors have interpreted as indicating that the effects of ingesting Bufo secretions have been known in Mesoamerica for many years; however, others doubt that this art provides sufficient "ethnohistorical evidence" to support the claim.

In addition to bufotenin, Bufo venoms also contain digoxin-like cardiac glycosides, and ingestion of the venom can be fatal. Ingestion of Bufo toad venom and eggs by humans has resulted in several reported cases of poisoning, some of which resulted in death. A court case in Spain, involving a physician who dosed people with smoked Mexican Toad poison, one of his customers died after inhaling three doses, instead of the usual of only one, had images of intoxicated with this smoke suffering obvious hypocalcemic hand muscular spasms.

Reports in the mid-1990s indicated that bufotenin-containing toad venom had appeared as a street drug, supposedly but in fact not an aphrodisiac, ingested orally in the form of ch'an su, or as a psychedelic, by smoking or orally ingesting Bufo toad venom or dried Bufo skins. The use of chan'su and love stone (a related toad venom preparation used as an aphrodisiac in the West Indies) has resulted in several cases of poisoning and at least one death. The practice of orally ingesting toad venom has been referred to in popular culture and in the scientific literature as toad licking and has drawn media attention. Albert Most, founder of the defunct Church of the Toad of Light and a proponent of spiritual use of Bufo alvarius venom, published a booklet in 1983 titled Bufo alvarius: The Psychedelic Toad of the Sonoran Desert which explained how to extract and smoke the secretions.

Bufotenin is also present in the skin secretion of three arboreal hylid frogs of the genus Osteocephalus (Osteocephalus taurinus, Osteocephalus oophagus, and Osteocephalus langsdorfii) from the Amazon and Atlantic rain forests.

Anadenanthera seeds

Bufotenin is a constituent of the seeds of Anadenanthera colubrina and Anadenanthera peregrina trees. Anadenanthera seeds have been used as an ingredient in psychedelic snuff preparations by indigenous cultures of the Caribbean, Central and South America since pre-Columbian times. The oldest archaeological evidence of use of Anadenanthera beans is over 4,000 years old.

Other sources
Bufotenin has been identified as a component in the latex of the takini (Brosimum acutifolium) tree, which is used as a psychedelic by South American shamans, and in the seeds of Mucuna pruriens.  Bufotenin has also been identified in Amanita citrina, A. porphyria, and A. tomentella.

Pharmacology

Uptake and elimination
In rats, subcutaneously administered bufotenin (1–100 μg/kg) distributes mainly to the lungs, heart, and blood, and to a much lesser extent, the brain (hypothalamus, brain stem, striatum, and cerebral cortex), and liver. It reaches peak concentrations at one hour and is nearly eliminated within 8 hours. In humans, intravenous administration of bufotenin results in excretion of (70%) of injected drug in the form of 5-HIAA, an endogenous metabolite of serotonin, while roughly 4% is eliminated unmetabolized in the urine. Orally administered bufotenin undergoes extensive first-pass metabolism by the enzyme monoamine oxidase.

Lethal dose
The acute toxicity of bufotenin in rodents has been estimated at 200 to 300 mg/kg. Death occurs by respiratory arrest. In April 2017, a South Korean man died of bufotenin poisoning after consuming toads that had been mistaken for edible Asian bullfrogs, while in Dec. 2019, five Taiwanese men became ill and one man died after eating Central Formosa toads that they mistook for frogs.

Effects in humans

Fabing & Hawkins (1955)
In 1955, Fabing and Hawkins administered bufotenin intravenously at doses of up to 16 mg to prison inmates at Ohio State Penitentiary. A toxic effect causing purpling of the face was seen in these tests.

A subject given 1 mg reported "a tight feeling in the chest" and prickling "as if he had been jabbed by needles." This was accompanied by a "fleeting sensation of pain in both thighs and a mild nausea."

Another subject given 2 mg reported "tightness in his throat." He had tightness in the stomach, tingling in pretibial areas, and developed a purplish hue in the face indicating blood circulation problems. He vomited after 3 minutes.

Another subject given 4 mg complained of "chest oppression" and that "a load is pressing down from above and my body feels heavy." The subject also reported "numbness of the entire body" and "a pleasant Martini feeling-my body is taking charge of my mind." The subject reported he saw red spots passing before his eyes and red-purple spots on the floor, and the floor seemed very close to his face. Within 2 minutes these visual effects were gone, and replaced by a yellow haze, as if he were looking through a lens filter.

Fabing and Hawkins commented that bufotenin's psychedelic effects were "reminiscent of LSD and mescaline but develop and disappear more quickly, indicating rapid central action and rapid degradation of the drug".

Isbell (1956)
In 1956, Harris Isbell at the Public Health Service Hospital in Lexington, Kentucky, experimented with bufotenin as a snuff. He reported "no subjective or objective effects were observed after spraying with as much as 40 mg bufotenine"; however, subjects who received 10–12 mg by intramuscular injection reported "elements of visual hallucinations consisting of a play of colors, lights, and patterns."

Turner & Merlis (1959)
Turner and Merlis (1959) experimented with intravenous administration of bufotenin (as the water-soluble creatinine sulfate salt) to schizophrenics at a New York state hospital. They reported that when one subject received 10 mg during a 50-second interval, "the peripheral nervous system effects were extreme: at 17 seconds, flushing of the face, at 22 seconds, maximal inhalation, followed by maximal hyperventilation for about 2 minutes, during which the patient was unresponsive to stimuli; her face was plum-colored." Finally, Turner and Merlis reported:

After pushing doses to the morally admissible limit without producing visuals, Turner and Merlis conservatively concluded: "We must reject bufotenine . . . as capable of producing the acute phase of Cohoba intoxication."

McLeod and Sitaram (1985)
A 1985 study by McLeod and Sitaram in humans reported that bufotenin administered intranasally at a dose of 1–16 mg had no effect, other than intense local irritation. When given intravenously at low doses (2–4 mg), bufotenin oxalate caused anxiety but no other effects; however, a dose of 8 mg resulted in profound emotional and perceptual changes, involving extreme anxiety, a sense of imminent death, and visual disturbance associated with color reversal and distortion, and intense flushing of the cheeks and forehead.

Ott (2001)
In 2001, ethnobotanist Jonathan Ott published the results  of a study in which he self-administered free base bufotenin via insufflation (5–100 mg), sublingually (50 mg), intrarectally (30 mg), orally (100 mg) and via vaporization (2–8 mg). Ott reported "visionary effects" of intranasal bufotenin and that the "visionary threshold dose" by this route was 40 mg, with smaller doses eliciting perceptibly psychoactive effects. He reported that "intranasal bufotenine is throughout quite physically relaxing; in no case was there facial rubescence, nor any discomfort nor disesteeming side effects".

At 100 mg, effects began within 5 minutes, peaked at 35–40 minutes, and lasted up to 90 minutes. Higher doses produced effects that were described as psychedelic, such as "swirling, colored patterns typical of tryptamines, tending toward the arabesque".
Free base bufotenin taken sublingually was found to be identical to intranasal use. The potency, duration, and psychedelic action was the same. Ott found vaporized free base bufotenin active from 2–8 mg with 8 mg producing "ring-like, swirling, colored patterns with eyes closed". He noted that the visual effects of insufflated bufotenin were verified by one colleague, and those of vaporized bufotenin by several volunteers.

Ott concluded that free base bufotenin taken intranasally and sublingually produced effects similar to those of Yopo without the toxic peripheral symptoms, such as facial flushing, observed in other studies in which the drug was administered intravenously.

Association with schizophrenia and other mental disorders
A study conducted in the late 1960s reported the detection of bufotenin in the urine of schizophrenic subjects; however, subsequent research has failed to confirm these findings.

Studies have detected endogenous bufotenin in urine specimens from individuals with other psychiatric disorders, such as infant autistic patients. Another study indicated that paranoid violent offenders or those who committed violent behaviour towards family members have higher bufotenin levels in their urine than other violent offenders.

A 2010 study utilized a mass spectrometry approach to detect levels of bufotenin in the urine of individuals with severe autism spectrum disorder (ASD), schizophrenia, and asymptomatic subjects. Their results indicate significantly higher levels of bufotenin in the urine of the ASD and schizophrenic groups when compared to asymptomatic individuals.

Legal status

Australia
Bufotenin is classified as a Schedule I controlled substance according to the Criminal Code Regulations of the Government of the Commonwealth of Australia. It is also listed as a Schedule 9 substance under the Poisons Standard (October 2015). A schedule 9 drug is outlined in the Poisons Act 1964 as "Substances which may be abused or misused, the manufacture, possession, sale or use of which should be prohibited by law except when required for medical or scientific research, or for analytical, teaching or training purposes with approval of the CEO."

United Kingdom
In the United Kingdom, bufotenin is a Class A drug under the 1971 Misuse of Drugs Act.

United States
Bufotenin (DEA Drug Code 7403) is regulated as a Schedule I drug by the Drug Enforcement Administration at the federal level in the United States and is therefore illegal to buy, possess, and sell.

Sweden
Sweden's public health agency suggested classifying Bufotenin as a hazardous substance, on May 15, 2019.

See also 
 5-HO-DiPT
Hamilton's Pharmacopeia
 List of entheogens
 O-Acetylbufotenine
 Tryptamines
 Cane toad
 Colorado River toad
 Anadenanthera colubrina
 Anadenanthera peregrina

References

External links 
Erowid's Bufotenin Vault
TiHKAL entry on Bufotenin
Bufotenin (5-HO-DMT) entry in TiHKAL • info

Entheogens
Psychedelic tryptamines
Tryptamine alkaloids
Vertebrate toxins
Phenols
Serotonin receptor agonists
Plant toxins
Substances discovered in the 1930s